Pachygnatha terilis is a spider species found in Switzerland, Austria and Italy.

See also
 List of Tetragnathidae species

References

External links

Tetragnathidae
Spiders of Europe
Spiders described in 1991